Buková is the name of several locations:

In the Czech Republic:
 Buková (Plzeň-South District), a village in the Plzeň Region
 Buková (Prostějov District), a village in the Olomouc Region
 Buková u Příbramě, a village in the Central Bohemian Region
 Nová Buková, a village in the Vysočina Region
 Velká Buková, a village in the Central Bohemian Region

In Slovakia:
 Buková, Trnava District, a village in the Trnava Region